Sveinn Aron Guðjohnsen (born 12 May 1998) is an Icelandic footballer who plays as a forward for Allsvenskan club IF Elfsborg and the Iceland national team.

Club career
Sveinn Aron spent the first three years of his senior club career in Icelandic leagues, first 1. deild karla and then the top-level Úrvalsdeild karla.

On 26 July 2018, he signed with the Italian Serie B club Spezia. He made his Serie B debut for Spezia on 29 September 2018 in a game against Carpi as a 59th-minute substitute for Andrey Galabinov.

On 31 January 2019, he was loaned to Serie C club Ravenna. On 13 September 2020, he was loaned out again, this time to Danish Superliga club Odense Boldklub for the 2020–21 season.

On 14 August 2021, Sveinn Aron signed with IF Elfsborg in Sweden until the end of 2024.

International career
Sveinn Aron represented Iceland at the 2021 UEFA European Under-21 Championship, where he started in the first two group stage games, both of which Iceland lost (he scored the squad's only goal at the tournament in a 1–4 loss to Russia). Instead of playing in the closing game on 31 March, he was called up to the senior squad and made his debut for it on the same day in a World Cup qualifier against Liechtenstein.

Personal life
Sveinn Aron's father Eiður Guðjohnsen is the joint record goalscorer for the Iceland national football team and played for many notable clubs, such as Bolton Wanderers, Chelsea, Barcelona and Tottenham Hotspur. His grandfather Arnór Guðjohnsen also represented Iceland internationally for many years. His younger brothers Andri and Daniel Tristan are, as of September 2021, on the youth teams of Real Madrid. His uncle Arnór Borg (son of Arnór and half-brother of Eiður) plays in Iceland for Fylkir on loan from the Championship club Swansea City.

Career statistics

Club

International

Honours 
Valur

 Icelandic Cup: 2016
 Icelandic Super Cup: 2017

References

External links
 

1998 births
Sportspeople from Reykjavík
Living people
Sveinn Aron Guðjohnsen
Sveinn Aron Guðjohnsen
Sveinn Aron Guðjohnsen
Association football forwards
Sveinn Aron Guðjohnsen
Sveinn Aron Guðjohnsen
Sveinn Aron Guðjohnsen
Sveinn Aron Guðjohnsen
Sveinn Aron Guðjohnsen
Spezia Calcio players
Ravenna F.C. players
Odense Boldklub players
IF Elfsborg players
Sveinn Aron Guðjohnsen
Sveinn Aron Guðjohnsen
Serie B players
Serie C players
Danish Superliga players
Allsvenskan players
Guðjohnsen family
Icelandic expatriate sportspeople in Spain
Icelandic expatriate sportspeople in Italy
Icelandic expatriate sportspeople in Denmark
Icelandic expatriate sportspeople in Sweden
Expatriate footballers in Spain
Expatriate footballers in Italy
Expatriate men's footballers in Denmark
Expatriate footballers in Sweden
Iceland under-21 international footballers
Iceland international footballers